Gangding Station is a station on Line 3 of the Guangzhou Metro. It started operation on 30December 2006 and is located under Zhongshan Avenue West in the Tianhe District of Guangzhou.

Station layout

Exits

References

Railway stations in China opened in 2006
Guangzhou Metro stations in Tianhe District